Ningbonese ("of or related to Ningbo") may refer to:

 Ningbonese dialect of Chinese